Conotocaurius (Town Destroyer, Seneca: Hanödaga꞉nyas) was a nickname given to George Washington by Iroquois peoples in 1753. The name in its original language(s) has been given variously as Conotocarius, Conotocaurious, Caunotaucarius, Conotocarious, Hanodaganears, and Hanadahguyus. It has also been translated as "Town Taker", "Burner of Towns", "Devourer of Villages", or "he destroys the town".

History 

Washington was given the name in 1753 by the Seneca leader Tanacharison. The nickname had previously been given to his great-grandfather John Washington in the late seventeenth century. He had participated in an effort to suppress Indigenous peoples defending themselves in Virginia and Maryland. It involved members of both the Susquehannah and the Piscataway, an Algonquian tribe that lived across the Potomac River from Mount Vernon. Following the massacre of five chiefs who had come out to negotiate under a flag of truce to the colonizers, the Susquehannahs gave John Washington an Algonquian name that translated to "town taker" or "devourer of villages." The elder Washington's reputation was remembered and when they met his great-grandson in 1753 they called George Washington by the same name, Conotocarious.

Washington referred to himself as "Conotocaurious" in a letter he wrote to Andrew Montour dated October 10, 1755, in which he tried to manipulate the Oneida to resettle on the Potomac:

Recommend me kindly to our good friend Monacatootha, and others; tell them how happy it would make Conotocaurious to have an opportunity of taking them by the hand at Fort Cumberland, and how glad he would be to treat them as brothers of our Great King beyond the waters. "

In 1779 during the American Revolutionary War, the Sullivan Expedition, under Washington's orders, destroyed over 40 Iroquois villages in New York, partially in response to Iroquois participation in attacks on the Wyoming Valley in July 1778 and Cherry Valley in November 1778. In 1790, the Seneca chief Cornplanter told President Washington: "When your army entered the country of the Six Nations, we called you Town Destroyer and to this day when your name is heard our women look behind them and turn pale, and our children cling close to the necks of their mothers."

Notes

References 

 The life of George Washington Vol I,II,III and IV by John Marshall
 Ellis, Joseph J. Excellency: George Washington. New York: Knopf, 2004. .
 Graymont, Barbara. The Iroquois in the American Revolution. Syracuse, New York: Syracuse University Press, 1972. ;  (paperback).
 Lewis, Thomas A. For King and Country: The Maturing of George Washington, 1748-1760. New York: HarperCollins, 1992. .
 Randall, Willard Sterne. George Washington: A Life. New York: Henry Holt, 1997. .

George Washington
Iroquois
Nicknames of military personnel
Genocides in North America